BlueGriffon is a WYSIWYG content editor for the World Wide Web. It is based on the discontinued Nvu editor, which in turn is based on the Composer component of the Mozilla Application Suite, which was previously known as Netscape Composer, which was bundled with Netscape Gold before it was renamed to Netscape Communicator. Powered by Gecko, the rendering engine of Firefox, it can edit Web pages in conformance to Web Standards. It runs on Microsoft Windows, macOS and Linux.

BlueGriffon complies with the W3C's web standards. It can create and edit pages in accordance to HTML 4, XHTML 1.1, HTML 5 and XHTML 5. It supports CSS 2.1 and all parts of CSS 3 already implemented by Gecko. BlueGriffon also includes SVG-edit, an XUL-based editor for SVG that is originally distributed as an add-on to Firefox and was adapted to BlueGriffon.

A version is free to download and is available on Windows, macOS and Linux.

Two enhancements are available via add-ons: 'FireFTP' and 'Dictionaries' in 13 languages, free to download.

Awards 
Disruptive Innovations was one of five Innovation award winners for its BlueGriffon project during the Demo Cup organized as part of the 2010 Open World Forum held in Paris in October 2010.

In 2013, Disruptive Innovations received the META Seal of Recognition from the Multilingual Europe Technology Alliance for being the first editor to implement the three main data categories of the W3C Internationalization Tag Set 2.0

See also 

 Comparison of HTML editors
 KompoZer, also based on Nvu
 Maqetta

References

External links 
 

Mozilla
Free HTML editors
Linux text-related software
Cross-platform software
Software that uses XUL
Software using the Mozilla license